The Cleveland mayoral election of 1933 saw former Governor Harry L. Davis unseat incumbent mayor Ray T. Miller.

General election

References

Mayoral elections in Cleveland
Cleveland mayoral
Cleveland
November 1933 events in the United States
1930s in Cleveland